Jacobs Dream is the self-titled debut by the Ohio-based Christian power metal band Jacobs Dream. The album was released on Metal Blade Records in the year 2000.

Track listing
 "Kinescope" - 3:34
 "Funambulism" - 4:34
 "Scape Goat" - 5:07
 "Mad House of Cain" - 3:01
 "Tale of Fears" - 4:30
 "Crusade" - 4:10
 "Black Watch" (instrumental) - 3:56
 "Love & Sorrow" - 4:15
 "The Gathering" - 3:25
 "Never Surrender" - 4:13
 "The Bleeding Tree" - 3:49
 "Violent Truth" (bonus track) - 3:19

Credits
James Evans - Bass
John Berry - Guitar, Synth
Gary Holtzman - Guitar
David Taylor - Vocals
Rick May - Drums

References

Jacobs Dream albums
2000 debut albums